Comfort and Joy is the third soundtrack album by British singer-songwriter and guitarist Mark Knopfler, released in 1984 by Vertigo Records. The album contains music composed for the 1984 film Comfort and Joy, written and directed by Bill Forsyth.

Composition
Although the album consists of only three original pieces written for the film, additional songs from the Dire Straits album Love over Gold were used throughout the film. According to a review of the film by Philip Gillett, director Forsyth once acknowledged in an interview that he was "trying to mirror the tone" of the album by featuring the tracks "Telegraph Road" and "Private Investigations". Dialogue in the film also makes reference to the band and song lyrics. After the main character Allan "Dicky" Bird's car has been vandalized, a colleague quips, "I hear the seven deadly sins and the terrible twins came to call on you"—a direct quote from the song "It Never Rains". Bird responds, "Dire Straits!"

Track listing
All songs were written by Mark Knopfler.
Side one
 "Comfort" (Theme from Comfort and Joy) – 2:28
 "Joy" – 4:20

Side two
 "A Fistful of Ice-Cream" – 4:42

Personnel
Music
 Mark Knopfler – guitars and mandolin
 Chris White – saxophone
 Guy Fletcher – keyboards
 Mickey Feat – bass
 Terry Williams – drums

Production
 Mark Knopfler – producer
 Neil Dorfsman – engineer
 Matt D'Arbanlay-Butler – assistance engineer

Release history
The Comfort and Joy soundtrack was released as a three-song 12" vinyl record in 1984. It has never been released in CD format, but the songs were issued in CD as b-side of some CD singles.

References

External links
 

Mark Knopfler soundtracks
Albums produced by Mark Knopfler
1984 soundtrack albums
1980s film soundtrack albums
Vertigo Records soundtracks